Australia competed at the 1980 Summer Olympics in Moscow, USSR. In partial support of the American-led boycott of the 1980 Summer Olympics Australia competed under the Olympic Flag. 120 competitors, 92 men and 28 women, took part in 92 events in 17 sports.

Flag bearers Denise Boyd (athletics) and Max Metzker (swimming), Australia’s first joint-flag carriers, carried the Olympic flag in the opening ceremony instead of the national flag. Countries marched in order of the Russian alphabet, and Australia was therefore second in the parade of nations, following Greece, which has traditionally led the march since 1928.

Archery

In the third Olympic archery competition that Australia contested, the nation sent two women and one man. Carole Toy, a veteran of the 1972 Games, repeated her 15th-place performance despite shooting 20 points lower.

Women's Individual Competition:
Terene Donovan — 2343 points (→ 9th place)
Carole Toy — 2285 points (→ 15th place)

Men's Individual Competition:
Scott Dumbrell — 2271 points (→ 26th place)

Athletics

Men's 10,000 metres
 Bill Scott
 Heat — 28:58.8
 Final — 28:15.1 (→ 9th place)
 Stephen Austin
 Heat — 29:45.2 (→ did not advance)
 Gerard Barrett
 Heat — did not finish (→ did not advance)

Men's Long Jump
 Gary Honey
 Qualification — 7.44 m (→ did not advance)

Men's Triple Jump
Ian Campbell
 Qualification — 17.02 m
 Final — 16.72 m (→ 5th place)
Ken Lorraway
 Qualification — 16.80 m
 Final — 16.44 m (→ 8th place)

Men's Marathon
 Robert de Castella
 Final — 2:14:31 (→ 10th place)
 Chris Wardlaw
 Final — 2:20:42 (→ 28th place)
 Gerard Barrett
 Final — did not finish (→ no ranking)

Men's Hammer Throw 
 Peter Farmer
 Qualifying Round — 69.16m (→ did not advance, 13th place)

Men's 20 km Walk
 David Smith
 Final — DSQ (→ no ranking)

Men's 50 km Walk
Willi Sawall
 Final — 4:08:25 (→ 8th place)
 David Smith
 Final — did not finish (→ no ranking)

Men's Decathlon
 Peter Hadfield
 Final — 7709 points (→ 13th place)

Women's 100 metres
 Denise Boyd
 Heat — 11.56
 Quarterfinals — 11.35
 Semifinals — 11.44 (→ did not advance)
 Debbie Wells
 Heat — 11.72
 Quarterfinals — 11.66 (→ did not advance)

Women's 100 m Hurdles
Penelope Gillies
 Heat — 13.68 (→ did not advance)

Women's Discus Throw
 Gael Mulhall
 Qualification — 54.90 m (→ did not advance)

Women's Shot Put
 Gael Mulhall
 Final — 18.00 m (→ 12th place)

Women's Javelin Throw
 Pam Matthews
 Qualification — 55.72 m (→ did not advance)
 Petra Rivers
 Qualification — 51.08 m (→ did not advance)

Women's High Jump 
 Christine Stanton
 Qualification — 1.88m
 Final — 1.91m (→ 6th place)

Basketball

Men's Team Competition
Preliminary Round (Group C):
 Lost to Cuba (76-83)
 Defeated Italy (84-77)
 Defeated Sweden (64-55)
Classification Round (Group B):
 Defeated Czechoslovakia (91-86)
 Lost to Poland (74-101)
 Defeated Senegal (95-64)
 Defeated India (93-75) → 8th place
Team Roster:
 Peter Ali
 Stephen Breheny
 Perry Crosswhite
 Mel Dalgleish
 Ian Davies
 Gordon McLeod
 Danny Morseau
 Les Riddle
 Larry Sengstock
 Phil Smyth
 Michael Tucker
 Peter Walsh
Head coach: Lindsay Gaze

Boxing

Men's Lightweight (– 60 kg)
Norm Stevens
 First Round — Lost to Geza Tumbas (Yugoslavia) on points (1-4)

Canoeing

Cycling

Ten cyclists represented Australia in 1980.

Individual road race
 Michael Wilson
 Kevin Bradshaw
 Remo Sansonetti
 Graham Seers

Team time trial
 Kevin Bradshaw
 Remo Sansonetti
 David Scarfe
 Michael Wilson

Sprint
 Kenrick Tucker

1000m time trial
 Kenrick Tucker

Individual pursuit
 Kelvin Poole

Team pursuit
 Colin Fitzgerald
 Kevin Nichols
 Kelvin Poole
 Gary Sutton

Diving

Men's Springboard
Steve Foley
 Preliminary Round — 521.82 points (→ 11th place, did not advance)

Men's Platform
Steve Foley
 Preliminary Round — 427.44 points (→ 16th place, did not advance)

Fencing

Three fencers, one man and two women, represented Australia in 1980.

Men's foil
 Greg Benko

Men's épée
 Greg Benko

Women's foil
 Mitzi Ferguson
 Helen Smith

Gymnastics

Judo

Modern pentathlon

One male pentathlete represented Australia in 1980.

Men's individual competition:
Robert Barrie — 4696 pts, 37th place

Rowing

Shooting

Mixed

Swimming

Men's 100m Freestyle
Neil Brooks
 Qualifying Heat — 51,11 (2nd)
 Semi-Finals — 52,70 (→ did not advance)
Graeme Brewer
 Qualifying Heat — 52,59 (4th)
 Semi-Finals — 51,91 (3rd)
 Final — 52,22 (→ 8th place)
Mark Tonelli
 Qualifying Heat — 52,04 (3rd)
 Semi-Finals — 52,17 (5th, did not advance)

Men's 200m Freestyle
Graeme Brewer
 Qualifying Heat — 1.51,92 (2nd)
 Final — 1.51,60 (→  Bronze Medal)
Ron McKeon
 Qualifying Heat — 1.52,66
 Final — 1.52,60 (→ 5th place)

Men's 400m Freestyle
Graeme Brewer
 Qualifying Heat — 3.57,19 (→ did not advance)
Max Metzker
 Qualifying Heat — 3.54,79 (2nd)
 Final — 3.56,87 (→ 7th place)
Ron McKeon
 Qualifying Heat — 3.56,77 (2nd)
 Final — 3.57,00 (→ 8th place)

Men's 1.500m Freestyle
Max Metzker
 Qualifying Heat — 15.21,63 (3rd)
 Final — 15.14,49 (→  Bronze Medal)

Men's 200m Butterfly
Paul Moorfoot
 Qualifying Heat — 2.05,69 (5th, did not advance)

Men's 100m Breaststroke
Peter Evans
 Qualifying Heat — 1.04,55 (2nd)
 Final — 1.03,96 (→  Bronze Medal)
Lindsay Spencer
 Qualifying Heat — 1.04,78 (3rd)
 Final — 1.05,04 (→ 6th place)

Men's 200m Breaststroke
Lindsay Spencer
 Qualifying Heat — 2.21,08 (2nd)
 Final — 2.19,68 (→ 5th place)
Peter Evans
 Qualifying Heat — 2.26,62 (4th, did not advance)

Men's 100m Backstroke
Mark Tonelli
 Qualifying Heat — 58,66 (1st)
 Semi Final — 57,89 (2nd)
 Final — 57,98 (→ 7th place)
Mark Kerry
 Qualifying Heat — 58,08 (3rd)
 Semi Final — 58,07 (3rd, did not advance)
Glenn Patching
 Qualifying Heat — 58,30 (1st)
 Semi Final — 1.00,31 (8th, did not advance)

Men's 200m Backstroke
Mark Kerry
 Qualifying Heat — 3.03,60 (1st)
 Final — 2.03,14 (→  Bronze Medal)
Mark Tonelli
 Qualifying Heat — 2.07,04 (3rd, did not advance)
Paul Moorfoot
 Qualifying Heat — 2.04,87 (1st)
 Final — 2.06,15 (→ 8th place)

Men's 400m Individual Medley
Paul Moorfoot
 Qualifying Heat — 4.34,28 (5th, did not advance)

Men's 4 × 200 m Freestyle Relay
Graeme Brewer, Mark Tonelli, Mark Kerry, and Ron McKeon
 Qualifying Heat — 7.34,06 (3rd)
 Final — 7.30,82 (→ 7th place)

Men's 4 × 100 m Medley Relay
Mark Kerry, Peter Evans, Mark Tonelli, and Neil Brooks
 Qualifying Heat — 3.48,94 (2nd)
 Final — 3.45,70 (→  Gold Medal)

Women's 100m Freestyle
Michelle Pearson
 Qualifying Heat — 58,90 (4th, did not advance)

Women's 200m Freestyle
Karen Ramsay
 Qualifying Heat — 2.06,06 (3rd, did not advance)

Women's 400m Freestyle
Michelle Ford
 Qualifying Heat — 4.13,90 (1st)
 Final — 4.11,65 (→ 4th place)
Rosemary Fydler
 Qualifying Heat — 4.21,36 (6th, did not advance)

Women's 800m Freestyle
Michelle Ford
 Qualifying Heat — 8.42,36 (2nd)
 Final — 8.28,90 (→  Gold Medal)
Rosemary Fydler
 Qualifying Heat — 8.49,47 (4th, did not advance)

Women's 100m Butterfly
Lisa Curry
 Qualifying Heat — 1.02,92 (3rd)
 Final — 1.02,40 (→ 5th place)

Women's 200m Butterfly
Michelle Ford
 Qualifying Heat — 2.12,72 (1st)
 Final — 2.11,66 (→  Bronze Medal)
Karen Ramsay
 Qualifying Heat — 2.17,82 (4th, did not advance)

Women's 200m Breaststroke
Lisa Curry
 Qualifying Heat — 2.39,42 (→ 5th place, did not advance)

Women's 200m Butterfly
Michelle Ford
 Final — 2.11,66 (→  Bronze Medal)

Women's 100m Backstroke
Lisa Forrest
 Qualifying Heat — 1.04,55 (3rd, did not advance)
Georgina Parkes
 Qualifying Heat — 1.05,06 (3rd, did not advance)

Women's 200m Backstroke
Lisa Forrest
 Qualifying Heat — 2.15,40 (1st)
 Final — 2.16,75 (→ 7th place)
Georgina Parkes
 Qualifying Heat — 2.17,78 (3rd, did not advance)

Women's 400m Individual Medley
Lisa Curry
 Qualifying Heat — 5.01,58 (→ 5th place, did not advance)

Women's 4 × 100 m Freestyle Relay
Lisa Curry, Karen Ramsay, Rosemary Brown, and Michele Pearson
 Qualifying Heat — 3.56,24 (2nd)
 Final — 3.54,16 (→ 5th place)

Women's 4 × 100 m Medley Relay
Lisa Forrest, Lisa Curry, Karen Ramsay, and Rosemary Brown
 Qualifying Heat — 4.23,33 (2nd)
 Final — 4.19,90 (→ 6th place)

Water polo

Men's Team Competition
Preliminary Round (Group C)
 Defeated Bulgaria (9-5)
 Lost to Cuba (4-6)
 Lost to Yugoslavia (2-9)
Final Round (Group B)
 Defeated Bulgaria (8-5)
 Drew with Romania (4-4)
 Defeated Greece (4-2)
 Defeated Sweden (9-4)
 Defeated Italy (5-4) → 7th place
Team Roster
 Michael Turner
 David Neesham
 Robert Bryant
 Peter Montgomery
 Julian Muspratt
 Andrew Kerr
 Anthony Falson
 Charles Turner
 Martin Callaghan
 Randall Goff
 Andrew Steward
Head coach: Tom Hoad

Weightlifting

Wrestling

Trivia
Norman May's call of the Men's 4 × 100 m Medley Relay, in which he excitedly exclaimed "Four, Three, Two, One. Gold, Gold to Australia, Gold", has become one of the most famous calls in the history of Australian sport.

See also
Australia at the 1978 Commonwealth Games
Australia at the 1982 Commonwealth Games

References

IOC Site on 1980 Summer Olympics
Official Report from the Organizing Committee (3 volumes) on the AAFLA website
sports-reference

Nations at the 1980 Summer Olympics
1980 Summer Olympics
Olympics